Newmark Knight Frank Frederick Ross is a locally owned commercial real estate and property service firm founded in 1888 in Denver, Colorado. It is the region's oldest full-service commercial real estate organization.

Originally named Frederick Ross Company, the business joined forces with New York-based Newmark Knight Frank, who partners with London-based Knight Frank in October 2010.

References

External links
Local Website
Corporate Website
Spring Hill Real Estate Services

Real estate services companies of the United States
Real estate companies established in 1888